The Caracazo is the name given to the wave of protests, riots and looting that started on 27 February 1989 in Guarenas, spreading to Caracas and surrounding towns. The weeklong clashes resulted in the deaths of hundreds of people, thousands by some accounts, mostly at the hands of security forces and the military. The riots and the protests began mainly in response to the government's economic reforms and the resulting increase in the price of gasoline and transportation.

Etymology
The term, “Caracazo,” stems from the city’s name, Caracas, and “-azo,” which stems from another historic event, the Bogotazo, was a massive riot in Bogotá, recognized as having a crucial role in Colombia’s history. “Caracazo” is technically defined as the “Caracas smash” or “the big one in Caracas” based on Spanish dialect.

Background
A fall in oil prices in the mid-1980s caused an economic crisis to take hold in Venezuela, and the country had accrued significant levels of debt. Nevertheless, the administration of President Jaime Lusinchi was able to restructure the country's debt repayments and offset an economic crisis but allow for the continuation of the government's policies of social spending and state-sponsored subsidies.

Lusinchi's political party, the Democratic Action, was able to remain in power following the 1988 election of Carlos Andrés Pérez as president. Pérez based his campaign in his legacy of abundance during his first presidential period and initially rejected liberalization policies; he received 53% of the vote, while the others gained at least 40%. At the time his election, Venezuela's international reserves were only $300 million USD; Pérez decided to respond to the debt, public spending, economic restrictions and rentier state by liberalizing the economy. Among the policies there was the reduction of fuel subsidies and the increase of public transportation fares by thirty percent.

Measures taken by Pérez included privatizing state companies, tax reform, reducing customs duties, and diminishing the role of the state in the economy. He also took measures to decentralize and modernize the Venezuelan political system by the direct election of state governors, who had previously been appointed by the president. The most controversial part of the economic reform package was the reduction of the gasoline subsidies, which had long maintained domestic gasoline prices far beneath international levels and even the production costs. The economic adjustment program was announced by the government on 16 February and on the weekend of 25–26 February 1989, gasoline prices rose 100 per cent and the fuel price increase in turn needed an increase in public transportation fares of 30 per cent officially, and more in practice as some carriers refused to limit their prices to the official rate. The increase was supposed to be implemented on 1 March 1989, but bus drivers decided to apply the price rise on 27 February, a day before payday in Venezuela.

According to retired Venezuelan General Carlos Julio Peñaloza Zambrano, Cuban agents might have entered Venezuela during Carlos Andrés Pérez's inauguration ceremony, which was attended by Fidel Castro, and may have waited for unrest to occur in Venezuela so they could exacerbate political tensions.

Protests and rioting

Despite initial debate within the government over how to manage the situation, a heavy-handed approach was implemented as a state of emergency and martial law were imposed. On February 28, Pérez suspended a number of articles of the Constitution, including Article 60 (right to individual liberty and security), Article 62 (inviolability of the home), Article 66 (freedom of expression), Article 71 (right to gather publicly and privately), and Article 115 (right to peaceful protest). The rights were not completely restored until March 22, and in the interim, there was no official decree or resolution to define how government authority would be exercised in the absence of those constitutional rights.

 

By the time authorities encountered the scenes of rioting, citizens began firing weapons at officers, with the ensuing firefights resulting in many bystanders being killed by "bullets from army troops and from sniping protesters." In many poor areas, citizens destroyed their own local commercial facilities, with food markets so damaged that their food distribution system was ruined. Much of the rioters destroyed properties indiscriminately, with no motives related to initial protests. According to Amnesty International, tactics used by security forces included "disappearances," the use of torture, and extrajudicial killings. As part of the government's security forces, members of Hugo Chávez's MBR-200 allegedly participated in the crackdown. Chávez himself was sick that day with measles. As tensions eased, troops began to sweep through neighborhoods collecting appliances and cash registers and informing citizens that if they provided a certificate of purchase, the items would be returned.

The initial official pronouncements stated that 276 people had died but many estimates put the number at above 2,000. Shortages of coffins were reported and many Venezuelans had to line up at government food distribution centers since markets were destroyed by rioters. Insurance estimates of damage caused during the rioting were $90 million USD ($120 million CAD).

Aftermath and consequences
On March 3, 1989, President Carlos Andres Pérez spoke with U.S. President George H. W. Bush. President Bush offered Pérez a US$450 million emergency loan. Pérez thanked Bush and asked him to support a change in debt policy toward Latin America: "I want to tell you if there is no change in [international] debt policy then whatever we may do here may be useless." Pérez told Bush that he had sent him a letter several days earlier and that he would appreciate it if he would read it. Pérez also visited Bush in Washington on April 1, 1989.

Political instability
The clearest consequence of the Caracazo was political instability. The following February, the army was called to contain similar riots in Puerto La Cruz and Barcelona and again in June, when rising of transportation costs ended in riots in Maracaibo and other cities. The reforms were modified.

The MBR-200, which in 1982 had promised to depose the bipartisanship governments, repudiated the Caracazo and accelerated its preparation for a coup d'état against the Perez government. In 1992, there were two attempted coups in February and November. Pérez was later accused of corruption and removed from the presidency. Chávez, a MBR-200 leader and an organiser of one of the coups, was found guilty of sedition and incarcerated. However, he was subsequently pardoned by Pérez's successor, Rafael Caldera, and he went on to be elected president after the latter."

Investigations

A commission was established in the Venezuelan Congress with all its political parties to investigate the events during the Caracazo and unanimously voted for a report that concluded that 277 people were killed.

In 1998, the Inter-American Commission on Human Rights condemned the government's action and referred the case to the Inter-American Court of Human Rights. In 1999, the Court heard the case and found that the government had committed violations of human rights, including extrajudicial killings. The Venezuelan government, by then headed by Chávez, did not contest the findings of the case and accepted full responsibility for the government's actions.

In August 2009, Defense Minister Italo del Valle Alliegro was charged in relation to the Caracazo. In July 2010, the Supreme Court overturned an appeal court ruling, which had declared the case covered by a statute of limitations.

In popular culture 
Román Chalbaud's 2005 homonymous film, El Caracazo, features an account of the events.

The Venezuelan rock band La Vida Bohème also sings about the Caracazo.

See also
Bogotazo
Cordobazo
Rosariazo
Dakazo
List of massacres in Venezuela

Further reading
 Margarita López Maya, "The Venezuelan Caracazo of 1989: Popular Protest and Institutional Weakness", Journal of Latin American Studies, Vol.35, No.1 (2003) pp. 117–37
 "The President's Telephone Conversation with President Carlos Andres Perez of Venezuela on March 3, 1989." George H.W. Bush Presidential Library Archives, Memcons and Telecons. Accessed October 26, 2011.

References

Bibliography

External links 

 
 

Riots and civil disorder in Venezuela
Protests in Venezuela
1989 in Venezuela
1989 riots
Carlos Andrés Pérez
Political riots
Political repression in Venezuela
Looting
February 1989 events in South America
Inter-American Court of Human Rights cases
March 1989 events in South America